Lajos Molnár (13 October 1946 – 23 March 2015)  was a Hungarian politician who was the Minister for Health from 2006 to 2007.

References

1946 births
2015 deaths
Government ministers of Hungary
Members of the National Assembly of Hungary (2006–2010)